Hospital gown may refer to:

Patient gown, clothing worn in a hospital by patients
PPE gown, gowns worn by medical professionals

See also 
 Scrubs (clothing)
 Gowning